Akersloot is a village in the Dutch province of North Holland. It is a part of the municipality of Castricum, and lies about 9 km south of Alkmaar. Until 1 January 2002, Akersloot was a separate municipality.

The oldest name for Akersloot was Axmericota, meaning "Oak Forest at the Sea".
In the years between 1250 and 1400, Akersloot gained the title "capital village of Kennemerland". Limmen was the second village in Kennermerland in prestige. In 1276 the people of Akersloot regained their rights and privileges from Count Floris V due to their bravery in the struggle against the Frisians. These privileges were removed by their former lord, the count of Holland, in the early 13th century because they rebelled against him.

Akersloot was razed in October 1573 by retreating Spaniards after the siege of Alkmaar. Several residences and other buildings were burnt to ashes.

After the 80-year war trade bloomed. Even seafaring and fishery was part of the Akersloot economy.

The Akersloot of today was isolated for a long time. Communication with the outer world was maintained through salon boats of the Alkmaar Packet. After the liberation good bus connections gradually emerged. Akersloot gained a yachting harbor, which now is one of the major ones on the Alkmaardermeer.

A bastion in Galle Fort in Sri Lanka is named Akersloot Bastion which was the birthplace of Willem Jacobszoon Coster who overtook Galle from Protuguess on 13 March 1640.

Notable person
 John Ton American Abolitionist
 Willem Jacobszoon Coster governor of Zeylan now Sri Lanka

Gallery

References

Municipalities of the Netherlands disestablished in 2002
Former municipalities of North Holland
Populated places in North Holland
Castricum